Ryan Jordan may refer to:

Ryan Jordan, Wikipedia user involved in the Essjay controversy
Ryan Jordan, vocalist for the American band Greenwheel